SomaFM is an independent Internet-only streaming multi-channel radio station, supported entirely with donations from listeners. SomaFM originally started broadcasting out of founder Rusty Hodge's basement garage in the Bernal Heights neighborhood of San Francisco, as a micropower radio station broadcast at the Burning Man festival in 1999. The response to the project was sufficiently positive that Rusty Hodge launched it as a full-time internet radio station in February 2000.

SomaFM takes its name from Soma, the "perfect pleasure drug" from Aldous Huxley's 1932 novel Brave New World, and the South of Market neighborhood of San Francisco, known colloquially as SoMa.

History 
In May 2002, the Digital Millennium Copyright Act Copyright Arbitration Royalty Panel rate ruling came into effect, requiring internet broadcasters to pay a per song per listener royalty to SoundExchange for the performance of the sound recording, retroactively through October 1998. Hodge estimated that the channel could have been forced to pay over $1,000 USD per day to continue operations. The royalty was later reduced by half, but that rate still would require payments by SomaFM that exceeded their revenues.

In June 2002, SomaFM ceased broadcasting. Hodge was one of several webcasters who testified before the U.S. Congress in 2002 in the hopes of reducing the royalty rate. Subsequently, Congress passed the Small Webcaster Settlement Act of 2002 (SWSA) on November 15, 2002, which enabled small webcasters to negotiate a lower rate with SoundExchange. SomaFM resumed broadcasting in late November 2002 under this new royalty structure.

In 2005, SomaFM partnered with Orban to begin streaming to 3GPP-compatible mobile devices, becoming one of the first internet broadcasters to support mobile streaming on 3G/EDGE networks. In June 2007, SomaFM participated in the "Internet Radio Day of Silence" in protest of the Copyright Royalty Board's decision at the time to raise royalty fees for internet radio stations.

In January 2013, SomaFM partnered with Aha by Harman International to make its content available via Aha apps in supported automobile dashboards. In 2014, SomaFM partnered with Qualcomm to include Allplay (part of the AllJoyn open source software framework) for wireless speakers in their mobile apps. Throughout its history, SomaFm, as well as its playlist curators, have been recognized with various awards and other honors.

List of channels

Notes

References

External links
 

Burning Man
Internet radio stations in the United States
Internet properties established in 1999
1999 establishments in California